William E. Smith House, also known as The French Country Inn, is a historic home located at Selma, Johnston County, North Carolina.  It was built about 1900 and enlarged to its present size about 1912, and is a two-story, Classical Revival style frame dwelling.  The front facade features an imposing pedimented portico supported by giant Ionic order columns.

It was listed on the National Register of Historic Places in 1982. It is located in the West Selma Historic District.

References

Houses on the National Register of Historic Places in North Carolina
Neoclassical architecture in North Carolina
Houses completed in 1912
Houses in Johnston County, North Carolina
National Register of Historic Places in Johnston County, North Carolina
1912 establishments in North Carolina
Historic district contributing properties in North Carolina